Hettenleidelheim is a former Verbandsgemeinde ("collective municipality") in the district of Bad Dürkheim, Rhineland-Palatinate, Germany. The seat of the Verbandsgemeinde was in Hettenleidelheim. In January 2018 it was merged into the new Verbandsgemeinde Leiningerland.

The Verbandsgemeinde Hettenleidelheim consisted of the following Ortsgemeinden ("local municipalities"):

Altleiningen
Carlsberg
Hettenleidelheim
Tiefenthal
Wattenheim

Former Verbandsgemeinden in Rhineland-Palatinate
Palatinate Forest